Pentamethylcyclopentadienyl iridium dichloride dimer is an organometallic compound with the formula [(C5(CH3)5IrCl2)]2, commonly abbreviated [Cp*IrCl2]2  This bright orange air-stable diamagnetic solid is a reagent in organometallic chemistry.

Structure
The compound has C2h symmetry.  Each metal is pseudo-octahedral.  The terminal and bridging Ir-Cl bonds have the lengths 2.39 and 2.45 Å, respectively.

Preparation, reactions
Pentamethylcyclopentadienyl iridium dichloride dimer was first prepared by the reaction of hydrated iridium trichloride with hexamethyl Dewar benzene. More conveniently, the compound is prepared by the reaction of hydrated iridium trichloride and pentamethylcyclopentadiene in hot methanol, from which the product precipitates
2 Cp*H  +  2 IrCl3(H2O)3   →   [Cp*IrCl2]2  +  2 HCl  +  6 H2O

The Ir-μ-Cl bonds are labile and can be cleaved to give a variety of adducts of the general formula Cp*IrCl2L.  Such adducts undergo further substitution to afford cations  and [Cp*IrL3]2+. The chloride ligands can also be replaced by other anions such as carboxylates, nitrite, and azide.

Reduction of [Cp*IrCl2]2 in the presence of CO affords [Cp*Ir(CO)2], which can be decarbonylated to give the unsaturated derivative [Cp*Ir(CO)]2.  Treatment of [Cp*IrCl2]2 with borohydride under an atmosphere of H2 gives the iridium(V) derivative Cp*IrH4.

[Cp*IrCl2]2 is a precursor to catalysts for the asymmetric transfer hydrogenation of ketones.

Related compounds
The 16e monomer (tBu3C5H2)IrCl2
 Pentamethylcyclopentadienyl rhodium dichloride dimer

References

Metallocenes
Organoiridium compounds
Dimers (chemistry)
Pentamethylcyclopentadienyl complexes
Chloro complexes